Flying Turns  is a wooden bobsled roller coaster at the Knoebels Amusement Resort in Elysburg, Pennsylvania. It is modeled after a similar ride designed by John Norman Bartlett and John Miller in the 1920s. The ride concept is similar to a modern steel bobsled roller coaster; however Flying Turns is made of wood, like the original rides. The layout of the ride is most similar to the original one that was at Riverview Park in Chicago, Illinois.

History 
Construction began in January 2006. In July 2007 the maintenance crew ran the first test car test runs which were completed successfully.  Then in October 2007 the same crew ran the first powered complete test runs of the same test cars, and gave the roller coaster enthusiasts a tour during the Phoenix Phall Phunfest 2007.  Later that month they began to run test runs of a five-car test train which will be the full length of the train.

An initial delay was due to an issue with the roller coaster car's wheels. The wheels were shipped back to their manufacturer in California and the issue was corrected. However, the ride did not open by the end of the 2008 season due to the cars travelling too quickly for passenger comfort.

According to Knoebels' website, the ride was to be opened during the 2009 season. The ride was re-tracked and profiled to accommodate new trains.

In June 2011, Knoebels posted an update to their blog, stating "We've been testing the newest version of the Flying Turns ride vehicles and are VERY encouraged.  There's still plenty of work to do but this is a very positive step in the right direction." They also posted to their Facebook page a video shot from a camera mounted on a prototype chassis.

As of May 26, 2012, a section of track at the brake platform, as well as the brake platform itself, had been removed.

As of July 30, 2012 the removed sections have been rebuilt to accommodate the newest trains that are being delivered.

In August 2012 Knoebels said that they planned on beginning testing for the newest trains soon, and that they believed they finally figured out how to get the trains to run smoothly.

On October 5, 2013, the ride officially opened to the public, though the ride actually began operating the previous evening on October 4, 2013. One train is painted green, one is painted yellow and the third is painted mauve. A fourth train is planned.

Awards
Flying Turns also won Best New Ride (Amusement Park) 2014.

See also
 2013 in amusement parks

References

External links
Construction Photos
Walking Tour of the Flying Turns (10.07.2006)
Flying Turns - Resurrecting a Legend. 2007 documentary by Storytellers Media Group about Flying Turns construction at Knoebels Amusement Resort 

Roller coasters introduced in 2013
Roller coasters in Pennsylvania
Best New Ride winners